Aglaia cucullata, also called Pacific maple, is a species of plant in the family Meliaceae. It is found in Bangladesh, India, Indonesia, Malaysia, Myanmar, Nepal, Papua New Guinea, the Philippines, Singapore, Thailand, and Vietnam.

References

cucullata
Near threatened plants
Taxonomy articles created by Polbot
Taxa named by François Pellegrin